Milliken Park railway station serves the west end of Johnstone and the south west of the village of Kilbarchan in Renfrewshire, Scotland. The station is managed by ScotRail and is on the Ayrshire Coast Line.

History 
The original Milliken Park station was opened on 21 July 1840 by the Glasgow, Paisley, Kilmarnock and Ayr Railway and was known as Cochrane Mill. The station was renamed Milliken Park on 1 March 1853 and closed to passengers on 18 April 1966. The site of this station's goods yard is now a bus depot. The signal box remained in use until it was destroyed by fire in an act of vandalism on 1 March 1978.

The current station opened on 15 May 1989, by British Rail to the south west of the original on the other side of new Cochranemill Road bridge (built in 1974–5) next to the Corseford Housing Estate. Provision for the station had been made in the siting and construction of the overhead electrification equipment.

Facilities
The station has neither car park nor ticket office, however, there is a ticket machine situated within the shelter of platform 1. There are also six cycle stands available.

Services
The Glasgow - Ayr stopping trains call here every 30 minutes off-peak (Monday to Saturday), with extra services at peak times.

References

Notes

Sources 

 
 

Railway stations in Renfrewshire
Railway stations in Great Britain opened in 1840
Railway stations in Great Britain closed in 1966
Railway stations in Great Britain opened in 1989
Former Glasgow and South Western Railway stations
Beeching closures in Scotland
Railway stations served by ScotRail
SPT railway stations
1840 establishments in Scotland
1989 establishments in Scotland
Johnstone